Ľuboš Bartečko (born July 14, 1976) is a Slovak former professional ice hockey forward. He began and concluded his career with hometown club, HK ŠKP Poprad in the Slovak Extraliga. He most notably played in the National Hockey League (NHL) for the St. Louis Blues and Atlanta Thrashers. He also competed at three Winter Olympics.

Playing career
Before Bartečko started his career in the NHL he played for the Chicoutimi Saguenéens and Drummondville Voltigeurs in the Quebec Major Junior Hockey League (QMJHL) and for the Worcester Ice Cats of the American Hockey League (AHL). He started his NHL career in 1998–99 with the St. Louis Blues.

His best year was the 1999–2000 season when he scored 16 goals and 39 points in 67 games and often played on a line with his fellow countrymen Pavol Demitra and Michal Handzuš. In 2001, he moved to Atlanta, playing for the Atlanta Thrashers. Since the 2003–04 season he returned to Europe, where he played for HC Sparta Praha in the Czech Extraliga and for HC Dynamo Moscow of Russian Superleague (RSL), where he won the league title in 2004–05.

After completing his 21 professional season, with his original club HK ŠKP Poprad in 2015–16, Bartečko announced his retirement from professional hockey and return to North America, in accepting an assistant coaching role in Illinois, with McKendree University Bearcats who compete in the ACHA Division II on August 24, 2016.

Career statistics

Regular season and playoffs

International

References

External links

1976 births
Living people
Atlanta Thrashers players
Chicoutimi Saguenéens (QMJHL) players
Drummondville Voltigeurs players
Färjestad BK players
HC Dynamo Moscow players
HC Lev Poprad players
HC Lev Praha players
HC Sparta Praha players
Ice hockey players at the 2002 Winter Olympics
Ice hockey players at the 2006 Winter Olympics
Ice hockey players at the 2010 Winter Olympics
Luleå HF players
MHK Kežmarok players
Modo Hockey players
Olympic ice hockey players of Slovakia
People from Kežmarok
Sportspeople from the Prešov Region
Piráti Chomutov players
St. Louis Blues players
SC Bern players
HK Poprad players
Slovak ice hockey left wingers
Undrafted National Hockey League players
Worcester IceCats players
Slovak expatriate ice hockey players in Russia
Slovak expatriate ice hockey players in the United States
Slovak expatriate ice hockey players in the Czech Republic
Slovak expatriate ice hockey players in Switzerland
Slovak expatriate ice hockey players in Sweden
Slovak expatriate ice hockey players in Canada